Konstantinos "Kostas" Vasileiadis (alternate spellings include: Costas, Vasiliadis, Vassiliadis) (born March 15, 1984) is a Greek professional basketball player who plays for Cáceres Ciudad del Baloncesto of LEB Oro. He is a 2.01 m (6 ft 7 in) tall swingman.

Professional career
Vasileiadis was born in Thessaloniki, Greece, (origin from Elevtherochori, Kilkis) and raised in Kilkis, Greece. He started his professional career with PAOK of the Greek Basket League. He was the team captain of PAOK, and he played there for 6 years, from 2000 to 2006. He had an outstanding start to his career with the club, before joining Málaga of the Spanish League.

Vasileiadis was a famous and popular player while he played with the Spanish giants Málaga during the 2006–07 season. The Spanish side was able to make an impact in European competitions, partly due to the play and efforts of Vasileiadis, while he was a member of the club. The fans of the club say that he will always be remembered and appreciated by them for his efforts and play for the team on the court.

On July 12, 2007, he signed a contract with the Greek EuroLeague giants Olympiacos, despite them being rivals to his personal favorite club and previous team, PAOK. He helped Olympiacos to a second-place finish in the Greek League during the 2007–08 season. Vasileiadis returned to PAOK for the 2008–09 season, as part of the club's revitalization movement under new ownership, after a previously poor 2007–08 season for the club. He was once again made the team's captain.

Before the 2008–09 season was over, he moved the Italian League club Sutor Basket Montegranaro. He signed a contract with the Spanish ACB League team Obradoiro CAB in August 2009. In 2010, he signed a 3-year contract with the Spanish club Bilbao Basket, with the third year being optional. He was named to the All-EuroCup First Team in 2013.

On July 19, 2013, Vasileiadis signed a contract with the Turkish League team Anadolu Efes.

On August 27, 2014, he signed a two-year deal with Unicaja Málaga. He left Málaga after one season.

In 2015, Vasileiadis returned home to play for PAOK Thessaloniki. With PAOK, Vasileiadis played through the Greek League's playoff quarterfinals against AEK Athens, where PAOK lost the series 2 games to 1. During the season, he averaged 14.7 points, 5.3 rebounds, and 2.1 assists per game in the Greek League, and 13.4 points and 4.8 rebounds per game in the EuroCup. At the end of the season, he rejoined Obradoiro, and played there until the end of the Spanish League season.

On June 17, 2016, he signed a two-year deal with AEK Athens. On July 24, 2017, he parted ways with AEK. On October 10, 2017, he joined Aries Trikala of the Greek Basket League. On December 5, 2017, he left Trikala and signed with Iberostar Tenerife for the rest of the 2017–18 ACB season.

On July 15, 2018, he signed a two-year deal with Monbus Obradoiro of the Liga ACB. On July 16, 2020, Vasileiadis and Obradoiro parted ways and his third stint with the Spanish club officially ended.

On April 9, 2021, he has signed with UCAM Murcia of the Spanish Liga ACB.

Career statistics

EuroLeague

|-
| style="text-align:left;"| 2000–01
| style="text-align:left;"| PAOK
| 2 || 0 || .1 || .000 || .000 || .000 || .5 || .0 || .0 || .0 || .0 || .5
|-
| style="text-align:left;"| 2006–07
| style="text-align:left;"| Unicaja
| 21 || 2 || 14.1 || .375 || .333 || .744 || 2.3 || .3 || .4 || .0 || 6.3 || 5.4
|-
| style="text-align:left;"| 2007–08
| style="text-align:left;"| Olympiacos
| 17 || 0 || 12.3 || .491 || .436 || 1.000 || 1.4 || .8 || .5 || .1 || 4.5 || 4.6
|-
| style="text-align:left;"| 2011–12
| style="text-align:left;"| Bilbao
| 20 || 9 || 22.8 || .416 || .376 || .877 || 2.1 || .8 || .8 || .1 || 10.8 || 9.2
|-
| style="text-align:left;"| 2013–14
| style="text-align:left;"| Anadolu Efes
| 23 || 15 || 27.2 || .415 || .403 || .902 || 2.7 || 1.4 || .8 || .1 || 10.8 || 9.1
|-
| style="text-align:left;"| 2014–15
| style="text-align:left;"| Unicaja
| 17 || 15 || 15.0 || .336 || .297 || .944 || 1.2 || .7 || .5 || .1 || 6.5 || 2.7
|- class="sortbottom"
| style="text-align:left;"| Career
| style="text-align:left;"|
| 100 || 41 || 18.4 || .401 || .370 || .862 || 2.0 || .8 || .6 || .1 || 7.8 || 6.4

Basketball Champions League

|-
|-
| style="text-align:left;" | 2016–17
| style="text-align:left;" | A.E.K.
| 11 || 22.6 || .373 || .353 || 1.000 || 2.3 || .9 || .7 || 0 || 7.5
|-
| style="text-align:left;" | 2017–18
| style="text-align:left;" | Tenerife
| 8 || 15.5 || .391 || .366 || .917 || 2.4 || 1.1 || .9 || 0 || 7.8
|}

National team career
At the national team level, Vasileiadis played as a youth with the junior men's Greek national teams. They won the bronze medal at both the 2002 FIBA Europe Under-18 Championship and the 2003 FIBA Under-19 World Cup, where he was also named to the All-Tournament Team. He was named to the 2004 FIBA Europe Under-20 Championship All-Tournament Team, which he also led in scoring.

The silver medal was also won and he was voted to the All-Tournament Team, at the 2005 FIBA Under-21 World Cup, which was held in Argentina. He was also a member of the Greece men's national basketball team. With Greece's senior national team, he played at the 2011 EuroBasket and at the 2014 FIBA World Cup. He also played at the 2012 FIBA World Olympic Qualifying Tournament.

Awards and accomplishments

Pro career
 Greek Youth All-Star Game MVP: (2004)
 3× Greek League All-Star: (2005, 2006, 2008)
 Spanish League Champion: (2006)
 All-EuroCup First Team: (2013)

Greek junior national team
2002 FIBA Europe Under-18 Championship: 
2003 FIBA Under-19 World Cup: 
2003 FIBA Under-19 World Cup: All-Tournament Team
2004 FIBA Europe Under-20 Championship: Top Scorer
2004 FIBA Europe Under-20 Championship: All-Tournament Team
2005 FIBA Under-21 World Cup: 
2005 FIBA Under-21 World Cup: All-Tournament Team

See also
 List of youngest EuroLeague players

References

External links
 Official Website
 Kostas Vasileiadis at acb.com 
 Kostas Vasileiadis at esake.gr 
 Hellenic Basketball Federation Profile 
 Kostas Vasileiadis at draftexpress.com 
 Kostas Vasileiadis at eurobasket.com
 Kostas Vasileiadis at euroleague.net
 Kostas Vasileiadis at fiba.com
 Kostas Vasileiadis at legabasket.it 
 Kostas Vassiliadis' Blog 

1984 births
Living people
2014 FIBA Basketball World Cup players
AEK B.C. players
Anadolu Efes S.K. players
Aries Trikala B.C. players
Baloncesto Málaga players
Bilbao Basket players
CB Canarias players
CB Murcia players
Greek Basket League players
Greek men's basketball players
Liga ACB players
Marinos B.B.C. players
Obradoiro CAB players
Olympiacos B.C. players
P.A.O.K. BC players
Sportspeople from Kilkis
Shooting guards
Small forwards
Basketball players from Thessaloniki
Sutor Basket Montegranaro players